Ju-ken (born June 27, 1971 in Funabashi, Chiba Prefecture, Japan) is a Japanese session bassist. He was a support member of Gackt, The Wanderers and Anna Tsuchiya. He is one of the most in-demand bassists in Japan.

Career 
Ju-ken started his professional career when he was 26 as a member of the band Nitro. He was also invited to work with Heath of X Japan in studio at around the same time.

Participated in Gackt Live Tour 2008-2009 «Requiem et Reminiscence II 〜再生と邂逅〜»

Discography

Anna Tsuchiya 
Anna Tsuchiya Inspi' Nana (Black Stones) (CD+DVD) (2007)
Bubble Trip/Sweet Sweet Song (CD+DVD) (2007)
Anna Tsuchiya feat. AI - Crazy World (CD+DVD) (2008)
Nudy Show! (2008)

1st Live Tour Blood Of Roses (DVD) (2007)

Ends 
Live 2005 Total Tone DVD (2005)

Gackt

Studio albums 
Crescent (2003)
7th night ~unplugged~ (2004)
Love Letter (2005)
Diabolos (2005)

Singles 
Todokanai ai to shitteita no ni osaekirezu ni aishitsuzuketa (2005)
Metamorphoze (2005)
BLACK STONE (2005)
Love Letter (2006)
Redemption (2006)

DVD 
Live Tour 2004 The Sixth Day & Seventh Night~Final~ (2004)
DIABOLOS ~Aien no Uta~ in Korea (2006)
Live Tour 2005 DIABOLOS ~Aien no Uta to Seiya no Namida~ (2006)
Greatest Filmography 1999-2006 ~Red~ (2007)
Greatest Filmography 1999-2006 ~Blue~ (2007)
Training Days 2006 Drug Party ~ Zepp Tokyo Live (2007)
Training Days in Taiwan Drug Party Asia Tour (2007)
Training Days in Korea Drug Party Asia Tour (2007)
Nine*Nine (2008)

Platinum Box V (2004)
Platinum Box VI (2005)
Platinum Box VII (2006)
Platinum Box VIII (2008)
Platinum Box IX (2009)

Tomoyasu Hotei

DVD 
MONSTER DRIVE PARTY!!! (2005)
All Time Super Best Tour (2006)
Super Soul Sessions (2007)
Hotei and The Wanderers — Funky Punky Tour 2007-2008 (2008)

Inoran 
ニライカナイ (Niraikanai) (CD+DVD) (2007)

Shue (酒井愁) 
夜露死苦哀愁 (CD) (2007)
Music author for «M-2.die in peace» (track 2 on the album)

VAMPS

Studio albums 
BEAST (2010)

Singles 
Love Addict (CD+DVD) (2008)

DVD 
VAMPS LIVE 2008 (2009)
VAMPS LIVE 2009 U.S.A. (2010)
VAMPS LIVE 2009 (2010)

Equipment 
Ju-ken primarily uses handmade Sugi and vintage and custom shop Fender basses

Sugi basses (names given by Ju-ken) 
 Sugi Burst
 Sugi Tiki
 Sugi Nero
 Sugi Daruma
 Sugi Spiderman
 Sugi Bel Verde

Fender Basses 
 Fender American Deluxe Jazz Bass (at least 2 of them)
 Fender '65 vintage Jazz Bass
 Fender '73 vintage Jazz Bass
 Fender '73 vintage Precision Bass
 Fender '78 vintage Precision Bass
 Fender Precision Bass (current model)
 Fender Custom Shop Jazz Bass

Other basses 
 Spector NS-2
 Musicman Stingray
 Michael Kelly Dragon Fly acoustic Bass

Other instruments 
 Paul Reed Smith Singlecut/20th Artist Package Guitar
 Unidentified Contrabass

Amplification 
 Fender 400h head
 Fender 810 Pro Enclosures cabinet
 MarkBass Mini Cmd 151p combo

Other equipment 
 Fostex FR-2LE Field Memory Recorder
 Fostex MC11S Stereo Microphone
 Fostex T50RP Headphones

References

 https://web.archive.org/web/20080928121134/http://www.ju-kenthebass.net/
 https://web.archive.org/web/20070515053034/http://snakepit.jp/mobileinfo.html
 https://web.archive.org/web/20081022183430/http://www2.fostex.jp/user_file/fostex-sh/etc/JU-KEN.html

External links
 https://web.archive.org/web/20100206010818/https://web.archive.org/web/20100206010818/http://ju-ken.velvet.jp/
 https://web.archive.org/web/20100202014231/http://blog.ju-ken.velvet.jp/
 http://www.quintillionquiz.com
 http://blog.quintillionquiz.com
 https://web.archive.org/web/20081121083303/http://www.hotei.com/pc/jp/tour2007-2008/
 http://hellmetz.blog111.fc2.com
 https://web.archive.org/web/20081022183430/http://www2.fostex.jp/user_file/fostex-sh/etc/JU-KEN.html

1971 births
Living people
Japanese bass guitarists
21st-century bass guitarists

sv:Ju-Ken